Gilmore Girls: A Year in the Life is an American comedy-drama streaming television miniseries created by Amy Sherman-Palladino and starring Lauren Graham and Alexis Bledel. It is the unofficial eighth season and a sequel to the television series Gilmore Girls (2000–2007).

The miniseries sees the return of Sherman-Palladino and her husband Daniel Palladino to the series after leaving prior to season 7. The series consisted of four 88-to-102-minute episodes, which were released on November 25, 2016, on Netflix. Each episode follows the characters through one of the four seasons.

In November 2020, the miniseries aired on The CW and Up TV.

Plot
Due to her frequent travels as a freelance journalist, Rory Gilmore (Alexis Bledel) gives up her apartment in favor of staying at her friends' homes in New York, Stars Hollow, and London.  In London, Rory stays with Logan Huntzberger (Matt Czuchry) while working on a book for the eccentric Naomi Shropshire (Alex Kingston). Although Logan is engaged, Rory and Logan are in a no strings attached affair. Rory has a boyfriend named Paul, though she never remembers him.  When Naomi fires her and Logan's fiancée moves in, Rory struggles with her lack of a career and her relationship with Logan.  She meets with Jess Mariano (Milo Ventimiglia), who encourages her to write her own book about her life with her mother.

Emily Gilmore (Kelly Bishop) grieves the recent death of her husband Richard (Edward Herrmann) and tricks her daughter Lorelai Gilmore (Lauren Graham) into starting therapy with her.  Lorelai has also been feeling lost due to the death of her father, the career progressions of her long-time business partners, and her relationship with Luke Danes (Scott Patterson).  Lorelai and Luke have been dating for over ten years but have yet to marry or discuss children. They consider using a surrogate, and attend a fertility clinic run by Paris Geller (Liza Weil). After fighting with Lorelai about the book idea, Rory storms off, and Lorelai heads to Patty's Dance Studio where Stars Hollow: The Musical is being performed. Leading lady Violet's ballad ("Unbreakable") inspires Lorelai to go on the Pacific Crest Trail and forget about her problems in a similar manner to Wild.  

Emily eventually accepts her husband's death, sells their home, effectively quits the DAR, and moves to Nantucket, single and independent for the first time in her life.  Despite never actually hiking, Lorelai returns from her trip, reconciles with Emily and Rory, and asks Luke to marry her.  Rory visits her father, Christopher Hayden (David Sutcliffe), to inform him of the wedding.  She asks him why he allowed Lorelai to raise her as a single mother, and they agree that it turned out for the best. Luke and Lorelai marry in the gazebo and, in the final scene of the series, Rory reveals to Lorelai that she is pregnant.

Cast and characters

Main 
 Lauren Graham as Lorelai Gilmore
 Alexis Bledel as Rory Gilmore
 Scott Patterson as Luke Danes
 Kelly Bishop as Emily Gilmore

Recurring

Guest

Musical Guests
Many musicians showed up in the revival playing songs in the town square as temporary troubadours. Some featured: 
Thurston Moore
Kim Gordon
Joe Pernice
Yo La Tengo
Mary Lynn Rajskub
Sparks

Episodes

Production

Development
On September 15, 2010, Lauren Graham told Vanity Fair that a Gilmore Girls movie is a definite possibility: "people with power, people who could actually make it happen, are talking about it." She stated the same thing in March 2013 through her Twitter account in the wake of companion show Veronica Mars earning Kickstarter funding for their film, saying it would be Sherman-Palladino's call for a film.

On June 11, 2012, while being interviewed for her new show Bunheads, creator Amy Sherman-Palladino reflected on the contract dispute and her own departure in an interview with Vulture, saying: "It was a botched negotiation. It really was about the fact that I was working too much. I was going to be the crazy person who was locked in my house and never came out. I heard a lot of 'Amy doesn't need a writing staff because she and [her husband] Dan Palladino write everything!' I thought, That's a great mentality on your part, but if you want to keep the show going for two more years, let me hire more writers. By the way, all this shit we asked for? They had to do [it] anyway when we left. They hired this big writing staff and a producer-director onstage. That's what bugged me the most. They wound up having to do what we'd asked for anyway, and I wasn't there."

In May 2015, in an interview on the Gilmore Guys podcast, Scott Patterson said: "There are talks going on at the moment. I can't really go into any detail, but there is some activity. So I'm hopeful, and you know, I'm in. [...] I think there's a lot of territory left unexplored that we could explore in a limited series or a TV movie or feature film, whatever that may be. I think it really just comes down to the script. I think everybody would jump on board." At the June 2015 ATX Television Festival in Austin, Texas, the cast reunited with creator Amy Sherman-Palladino where she told the audience, "I'm sorry, there's nothing in the works at the moment."

In October 2015, it was reported on TVLine that Netflix struck a deal with Warner Bros. to revive the series in a limited run, consisting of four 90-minute episodes. It was reported that Sherman-Palladino would be in charge of the new episodes. In April 2016, Sherman-Palladino said that the 90-minute format was inspired by the series Sherlock, of which she is a fan: "They're their own mini-movies. It felt like a format that would work well for us on a storytelling level".

On October 25, 2015, during a Wizard World Tulsa pop culture convention Q&A, Milo Ventimiglia stated, "I've always been pretty vocal about Gilmore and I know everybody's been waiting, and I was like, 'That will never happen,' and it's totally happening. While I was actually here, I got an email from the producers. Again, I'm always vocal (about producers) Amy Sherman-Palladino and Dan Palladino; they're two of my favorite people and two of my favorite writers ever of all time. Just to be able to speak their words again, of course I would do it. So I told them, yeah, of course I'll do it."

On January 29, 2016, Netflix and Warner Bros. officially confirmed the revival, tentatively titled Gilmore Girls: Seasons. Filming of the new episodes had started in Los Angeles as of February 2, 2016, and was scheduled to last until June 30, 2016, with Amy Sherman-Palladino and Daniel Palladino returning as writers and directors. On May 19, 2016, it was announced that the revival would be titled Gilmore Girls: A Year in the Life.

Producer Gavin Polone, who was involved in the original series as an executive producer with talent manager Judy Hofflund under their defunct Hofflund-Polone banner, sued Warner Bros. Television for a credit on the miniseries and additional payments for his early involvement in the original series (Hofflund retired from the business in 2013 and pursued no credits). Polone ultimately played no role in the miniseries and was uncredited when it was released. David S. Rosenthal, who took over as showrunner for Sherman-Palladino in the last season, also had no involvement in A Year in the Life.

Casting
On January 29, 2016, the day the revival was confirmed, it was reported that Lauren Graham, Alexis Bledel, Scott Patterson, Kelly Bishop, Sean Gunn, and Keiko Agena were set to return. Yanic Truesdale confirmed his return on Twitter later that day, as did David Sutcliffe. On February 1, 2016, Tanc Sade, who played Logan's friend, Finn, confirmed through his Twitter account that he would be joining the cast to reprise his role. On that same day, Aris Alvarado, who played Caesar, confirmed that he would be returning. Also on February 1, 2016, Mike Gandolfi confirmed that he was returning as Andrew in the series revival. In an interview with TVLine, Kelly Bishop confirmed that Rose Abdoo and Liza Weil would be returning for the revival. Matt Czuchry, Milo Ventimiglia, and Jared Padalecki would also return.

On February 10, 2016, Sally Struthers, Michael Winters, and Liz Torres, reprising the roles of Babette Dell, Taylor Doose, and Miss Patty LaCosta respectively, were announced as returning characters through detective work by a fan website. Carole King was also confirmed as returning to reprise her sometimes role of Sophie Bloom. Sutton Foster, from Palladino's Bunheads, was also cast. That same day, musician Grant Lee Phillips, who portrayed as a town troubadour, announced that he was reprising his role. On February 11, 2016, it was confirmed that Emily Kuroda would reprise her role as Mrs. Kim, Lane's mother, by TVLine. On the same day, Entertainment Weekly confirmed that David Sutcliffe, who played Christopher Hayden, would return for the revival as well. Danny Strong confirmed on February 11 that he, too, would be reprising his role as Doyle. Also on February 11, it was confirmed by Variety that Vanessa Marano, who played Luke's daughter, would be returning to the revival. On February 16, 2016, Sparky, the dog that played Lorelai's dog, Paul Anka, was confirmed as returning in the Netflix revival. 

Babette's husband, Morey, played by Ted Rooney, was confirmed as returning on February 17. On February 19, 2016, Jackson Douglas, who played Sookie's husband, Jackson, confirmed that he would be returning to the cast to reprise his role, despite rumors that Melissa McCarthy would not be reprising her role. On February 21, 2016, Gregg Henry, who played Mitchum Huntzberger, confirmed in an interview that he would reprise his role in the series. On February 23, 2016, Alan Loayza, who played Colin McCrae, Logan's friend, confirmed that he would reprise his role via his Twitter. Nick Holmes, who played the smaller role of Robert Grimaldi, confirmed through his Twitter account that he was returning to the series on February 29, 2016.

On March 9, 2016, Biff Yeager, who played the character Tom, confirmed through his Twitter account that he would return for the Netflix revival. On March 15, 2016, Dakin Matthews, who played Chilton's headmaster, Hanlin Charleston, was confirmed as returning for his role. On March 25, 2016, John Cabrera, who played Brian Fuller in Lane's band, Hep Alien, confirmed that not only he but all four members of the band would be returning to the series, including other members Zack Van Gerbig, who was played by Todd Lowe, and Gil, who was played by rock musician Sebastian Bach. On March 29, 2016, Chris Eigeman, who played the character of Jason Stiles in season 4, announced on Twitter that he was returning in the revival. On April 7, 2016, Melissa McCarthy officially announced on The Ellen DeGeneres Show that she would be returning for the revival.

Reception

Gilmore Girls: A Year in the Life received positive reviews from critics. The review aggregator website Rotten Tomatoes gave the series an approval rating of 87%, based on 87 reviews, with an average rating of 7.66/10. The site's critical consensus reads, "Gilmore Girls: A Year in the Life provides a faithful and successful revival of the quirky, sweet, and beloved series fans fell in love with over a decade ago." On Metacritic, the series has a score of 75 out of 100, based on 28 critics, indicating "generally favorable reviews". 

Some critics, however, suggested that the series didn't match the standards of the original show. NME's Luke Morgan Britton wrote: "Such nostalgic-fuelled expectations could never have been adequately matched, but the majority consensus from viewers since the new episodes dropped has been: “How did this all go so badly wrong?” Maybe, many wonder, it would’ve been better to not have gotten any new episodes at all. The new miniseries A Year In The Life does a brilliant job of shattering the hopes and dreams of fans."

Broadcast
The miniseries aired on The CW in November 2020 in an edited form, partly because the network needed additional programming to fill its schedule during the COVID-19 pandemic. It also aired on Up TV the same month.

References

External links
 
 

Gilmore Girls
2010s American comedy television miniseries
2010s American drama television miniseries
2010s American comedy-drama television series
2016 American television series debuts
2016 American television series endings
American sequel television series
English-language Netflix original programming
Television series about journalism
Television series by Warner Bros. Television Studios
Television series created by Amy Sherman-Palladino
Television shows set in Connecticut 
Television shows set in London